Wierzchy may refer to the following places:
Wierzchy, Kuyavian-Pomeranian Voivodeship (north-central Poland)
Wierzchy, Łódź East County in Łódź Voivodeship (central Poland)
Wierzchy, Poddębice County in Łódź Voivodeship (central Poland)
Wierzchy, Masovian Voivodeship (east-central Poland)
Wierzchy, Konin County in Greater Poland Voivodeship (west-central Poland)
Wierzchy, Pleszew County in Greater Poland Voivodeship (west-central Poland)
Wierzchy, Opole Voivodeship (south-west Poland)
Wierzchy, West Pomeranian Voivodeship (north-west Poland)